Unusual Weekly (Spanish: Semanario insólito) was an Argentinian television program which aired from 1982 and 1983 on ATC (Channel 7). It marked a milestone in the television of the country, and gained a cult following.

It was created by Carlos A. Aguilar, who was also the executive producer, and was succeeded by Raúl Becerra. The show debuted presenters from Becerra, such as Adolfo Castelo, Virginia Hanglin and Raúl Portal.

Its importance resides in being the first satire in the Argentinian news, in addition to having diverse sketches and segments, most notably, Surveys on the street and Happening magazine (which humorously analysed press releases); formats that later were reiterated in diverse programs, even in current affairs news.

The format was later adapted by The Rebellious News and turned into a successful genre, like programs such as Whoever May Fall, Television Registered and Informal Mornings, among others.

References

Bibliography

External links 
 
 Unusual weekly in YouTube.

Argentine television shows
Argentine comedy television series
Satirical television shows
Argentine satire